El Carmen may refer to:

Argentina
El Carmen, Jujuy, capital of El Carmen Department, Jujuy Province

Bolivia
El Carmen (Santa Cruz), a town in Santa Cruz Department, Bolivia

Chile
El Carmen, Chile

Colombia
El Carmen, Santander a municipality in the Santander Department
El Carmen de Atrato, a municipality in the Chocó Department
El Carmen del Darién, a municipality in the Chocó Department
El Carmen, Norte de Santander, a municipality in the Norte de Santander Department
El Carmen de Bolívar, a municipality in the Bolivar Department

Costa Rica
Carmen District, San José, a district in the San José canton

Ecuador

El Carmen Canton

El Salvador
El Carmen, Cuscatlán, a municipality in the Cuscatlán department
El Carmen, La Unión, a municipality in La Unión Department
Iglesia El Carmen, a church in the city of Santa Tecla, El Salvador

Mexico
El Carmen (Mexibús), a BRT station in Ecatepec de Morelos

Peru
El Carmen (San Juan Bautista), a town in San Juan Bautista district, Ica Province, Ica Region
El Carmen District, Chincha, a district in the Chincha Province within Ica Region

Spain
El Carmen (Madrid Metro), a Madrid Metro station

Barri del Carme, in the historical center of the city of València

See also
 Carmen (disambiguation)